Ennik Somi Douma (born March 9, 2001), known professionally by her Korean name Jeon Somi, is a Korean and Canadian singer, rapper and dancer signed under The Black Label. Jeon shot to domestic stardom as the first-place winner of the survival reality show Produce 101 and a member of the show's eleven-piece project girl group I.O.I. Following the conclusion of I.O.I's group activities, Jeon signed with YG Entertainment's subsidiary, The Black Label. She made her debut as a solo artist on June 13, 2019, with the single "Birthday" and released her first studio album XOXO in 2021.

Early life 
Jeon So-mi was born Ennik Somi Douma on March 9, 2001, in Windsor, Ontario, to a South Korean mother and a Canadian father of Dutch descent, Matthew Douma; her paternal grandfather immigrated to Canada from Heerenveen. She is the eldest of two daughters. When she was six months old, Ennik and her parents moved to Yeonhui-dong, Seoul in September 2001 because her mother had developed homesickness. Her father had previously resided in the area when he studied Taekwondo before moving back to Canada. At age four, she made an appearance on television with her father when he was being interviewed by KBS News for his part in clearing snow in the neighborhood.

She initially attended a school for foreigners before transferring to Seoul Midong Elementary School to practice Taekwondo. She stated that she experienced bullying and discrimination at the school because of her mixed ethnicity and wanted to dye her hair black and get surgery to blend in. She graduated from elementary school in 2013, after which she attended Cheongdam Middle School ; she graduated on February 3, 2017. Jeon completed her secondary education at Hanlim Multi Art School, majoring in Practical Music and Vocal, graduating in a ceremony held on February 7, 2020.

She first dreamed of becoming a singer after watching the music video for Rihanna's "Don't Stop the Music" as a child. At age nine, she was introduced to Korean pop and discovered Park Bom of 2NE1, whom she admired for her unique voice.

Career

2013–2017: Career beginnings and debut with I.O.I

Beginning in her fourth year of elementary school, Jeon auditioned at various entertainment companies in South Korea. In 2013, as a part of the Seoul Midong Elementary School's Taekwondo demonstration team, she appeared in the Children's Day Special for Let's Go! Dream Team Season 2, where she paired with Park Joon-hyung. That same year, she sang and made an appearance in a music video for English education.

In August 2014, Jeon, her mother and her grandmother briefly made an appearance on KBS2's Hello Counselor among the studio audience. She was also cast in a cameo role alongside her sister in the 2014 film Ode to My Father by director Yoon Je-kyoon, who her father was acquainted with and needed two biracial children for his film. That same year, Jeon auditioned for JYP Entertainment with "Lonely" by 2NE1 and was accepted into the agency's trainee program. In 2015, she appeared in label-mate Got7's "Stop Stop It" music video alongside other female trainees.
In May 2015, Jeon participated in Mnet reality survival program Sixteen, where she was pitted against fifteen other trainees from the agency to secure a spot in its first girl group in five years (now Twice) after the debut of Miss A; however, Jeon was eliminated in the final round and continued as a trainee. JYP Entertainment founder Park Jin-young stated she had star quality but lacked preparation.

In January 2016, as a representative of her label, Jeon participated in the competition series Produce 101 and finished in first place with 858,333 votes. After completing a two-and-a-half-year training period, fifteen-year-old Jeon officially debuted on May 4 with the project female group I.O.I and its first extended play Chrysalis under YMC Entertainment. On August 9, Jeon was included in a sub-unit of I.O.I consisting of six other members. The sub-unit released the single "Whatta Man", which debuted at number two on the Gaon Digital Chart. Jeon and her band-mates received their first-ever music show win with the single on SBS MTV's The Show. On August 29, Jeon collaborated with I.O.I band-mates Choi Yoo-jung and Chungha and Ki Hui-hyeon of DIA on the digital single "Flower, Wind and You". It entered the Gaon Digital Chart at number 48. In October, Jeon was selected as the new host for The Show, paired with singer Wooshin of UP10TION.

On January 9, 2017, it was confirmed that Jeon signed a formal contract with JYP Entertainment for her solo activities on television. The agency however, revealed they had yet to decide what path her future held. Jeon's activities with I.O.I soon ended following its disbandment on January 29, 2017. Shortly afterward, she joined the second installation of Sister's Slam Dunk as a regular cast member. On March 9, Eric Nam and Jeon released a collaborative digital single titled "You, Who?". The single charted at number 16 on the Gaon Digital Chart. On May 12, Jeon joined Unnies, a project group created by the production team of Sister's Slam Dunk 2. The group released the singles "Right?" and "Lalala Song". Upon release, the digital singles debuted at numbers two and 48, respectively, on the Gaon Digital Chart and numbers 10 and 22, respectively, on the Billboard World Digital Song Sales chart. "Right?" sold over 950,000 digital copies by the year's end.

On March 28, 2017, Jeon joined the KBS web entertainment program Idol Drama Operation Team. On the show, she and six other girl group members worked together to write their own drama series, Let's Only Walk the Flower Road, becoming accredited scriptwriters as well as acting in the series as fictional versions of themselves in a girl group. Final filming for the show took place on May 9. The seven cast members formed a project girl group called Girls Next Door and released a single as part of the show's soundtrack. The song, "Deep Blue Eyes", was co-written and co-composed by B1A4's Jinyoung and made available on June 14 through Warner Music Korea. The group held their debut stage on July 14 at Music Bank. In November 2017, Jeon featured on the digital single "Nov to Feb" by label-mate senior Jun. K of 2PM and performed the song in the special broadcast Jun.K X Rooftop Live on V Live.

2018–present: Solo debut and mainstream success 

On August 20, 2018, Jeon departed JYP Entertainment, terminating her contract with the agency following a formal discussion and mutual agreement. The following month, she signed an exclusive contract with YG Entertainment's independent subsidiary label The Black Label, home to South Korean R&B singer Zion.T. Jeon revealed she joined the label soon after her meeting with CEO Teddy Park, citing his authenticity and feeling of content while imagining future plans for her as reasons. In addition, Jeon believed The Black Label would aid and allow her to focus on her growth both as an artist and a person, which aligned with her interests, in contrast with the constant promotions and releases often seen in the industry.

On February 25, 2019, The Black Label revealed Jeon was preparing to make her debut as a solo artist with a lead single produced by Teddy. Her debut single "Birthday" was released on June 13 with an accompanying music video that surpassed four million views in 24 hours on YouTube. 18-year-old Jeon made her broadcast debut as a soloist on Show! Music Core, performing both "Birthday" and its B-side "Outta My Head" on June 15. The singles entered the Billboard World Digital Songs Chart at numbers five and nine, respectively, while "Birthday" peaked at numbers 22 and 18 on the Gaon Digital Chart and Billboard Korea K-pop 100, respectively. The lead single was also used in the trailer for Nora From Queens starring Awkwafina. Jeon soon joined the cast for Law of the Jungle in Chuuk with her father and Lose If You're Envious as one of the panelists of hosts.

On March 28, 2020, the reality series I Am Somi, was released on The Black Label's YouTube channel, a vlogging series on Jeon's life. In the sixth episode, Jeon revealed that her next release had been delayed and the series cut short due to travelling restrictions related to the coronavirus pandemic. 
On July 14, it was confirmed that Jeon would make her comeback on July 22 with a new single titled "What You Waiting For". 
On July 20, in conjunction with the release of "What You Waiting For", Jeon signed with Interscope Records and Universal Music Group for representation outside of Asia. On August 6, 2020, Jeon won her first music show trophy with "What You Waiting For" on Mnet's M Countdown.

On March 1, 2021, Jeon was invited by The Blue House to commemorate the 102nd anniversary of the Korean Declaration of Independence. The ceremony was held at Tapgol Park in Jongno District, Seoul and attended by President of South Korea, Moon Jae-in. She recited a reading from the March 1st Declaration of Independence alongside foreign activist descendants, entirely in the Korean language. The Blue House revealed they selected Jeon as a multicultural representative for her popularity as an idol promoting Korean content worldwide. Jeon and most members of I.O.I reunited on their fifth debut anniversary with the livestream special Yes, I Love It! on May 4; only members Kyulkyung and Mina were absent.

On July 23, Jeon was revealed to release a new single, "Dumb Dumb", on August 2. Its music video garnered 10 million views in under 24 hours on YouTube and 20 million views in two days, both personal records. The release peaked at numbers eight and nine on the Gaon Digital Chart and the Billboard Korea K-pop 100m respectively, marking her first top ten single as a soloist. "Dumb Dumb" also became her first chart entry in the Billboard Global Excl. U.S., debuting at number 130. In commemoration of the release, Jeon initiated a "Dumb Dumb Challenge" on TikTok, where the hashtag gained over 70 million views in two weeks and exceeded 122.7 million views the next day.

On October 14, 2021, The Black Label confirmed that Jeon would release her first full-length album, XOXO, and its lead single of the same name on October 29. The digitally-released singles "Birthday", "Outta My Head", "What You Waiting For" and "Dumb Dumb" were among the tracks on the album. The album went on to debut at number six on the Gaon Album Chart and sold 55,223 copies in the month of November. Lead single "XOXO" peaked at number 43 on the Gaon Digital Chart and became her first chart entry in the Billboard Global 200 at number 185.

Personal life 

Jeon is accredited in Taekwondo, having practiced the Korean martial art for over 10 years and taught initially by her father, who himself achieved a fourth degree black belt. She held a third-degree black belt for some time but could not gain the fourth degree due to her young age. On May 30, 2018, 17-year-old Jeon partook in the fourth degree black belt examination held by Kukkiwon, wherein her skills qualified for the upgrade. After she reached age of majority in South Korea, she applied for the conversion in dan and was officially certified as a fourth degree black belt holder, the level of an instructor qualified to run and manage a dojang.

Jeon and her family practice Korean Buddhism. She has stated that she has holds three passports to South Korea, Canada and the Netherlands.

Artistry

Fashion and style 
As a child, Jeon enjoyed expressing herself through clothes and fashion. Her personality extended to her own style, including a Louis Vuitton bag she customized with a drawing of a unicorn, which she believed resembles herself. Jeon commented, "I like monogram patterns and colors. When I think of the monogram bag my mother carried about 10 years ago, I still think it’s cool." For her single "What You Waiting For", Jeon was involved in the planning and styling process for her music video and worked closely with Serian, the current director of Vogue Korea. She selected looks portraying confidence and chose to wield a sword in the video to complete the "badass" look, with a hidden meaning relating to her birth name "Ennik", which translates to "sword" in Dutch. Jeon also often invests her time in DIY projects, enjoying taking clothing apart, putting the pieces back together, tearing them apart again, and repeating the process again as part of her experiments.

Songwriting 

Jeon began songwriting in her third year in middle school. Her first self-composed release, "Outta My Head" , was written while promoting as a member of I.O.I. She was casually humming the tune following her move to The Black Label, and Teddy asked if she had come up with it. With encouragement and help from in-house producer 24, the initially bright melody turned into a mid-tempo R&B song and was included on her debut single album, Birthday.

Jeon usually records two versions of songs she writes, each in a different language. After grasping the "feel" of the song in English, the lyrics are changed to Korean. She explained, "For example, if the lyric is 'orange', it will be changed to 'how long' (in Korean), making similar pronunciations". The original lyrics to the hook of her single "Dumb Dumb" were "Imma say it like it is / cut the bullsh*t / you dumb dumb"; in the official version, they have been translated to Korean. Jeon attributed the longer wait between comebacks to this recording process and vouched it improves the result.

As a soloist under The Black Label, Jeon has gained greater artistic and creative control over her music and career. She stated, "There are a lot of great producers, songwriters, creatives and people I truly respect here. I've matured both professionally and personally a lot by learning from them and seeing how they do things up close. But there is still a lot to go. I’m still definitely learning". She credits Teddy as an important mentor in her growth as a songwriter: "Every songwriter and producer has their own way to express themselves artistically and Teddy is helping me to find my own way."

Influences 
During her childhood, Jeon's favorite musicians were Cyndi Lauper, Rihanna and 2NE1. Growing up, Jeon also listened to the music of South Korean singer Seo Taiji, whom she described as an artist who "rocked the music industry", thanks to her mother's influence. Jeon also credited her father for introducing music from various countries and listened to music on cassette tapes because of her grandmother. Jeon also cites Lee Hyori as a role model in her career as a female soloist; Lee showcased multiple different concepts throughout her career, ranging from mature to bright, which Jeon views as an inspiration for her own image as an artist. 1TYM leader and CEO of The Black Label, Teddy Park, was another key mentor and influence named by Jeon. She shared that "Teddy is without a doubt, the most successful songwriting and composing figure in K-pop, period. Period. When I first saw him, it was like seeing a unicorn up close [...] I was in awe because growing up I used to listen to his music and dream of becoming a singer [...] One piece of advice Teddy gave me was to not only just focus on being a great singer and musician, but also focus on being a great person and that’s what I exactly aim to be."

Other ventures

Endorsements 

Her time as an I.O.I member contributed to her "Human Vitamin" image, which is also often referenced as one of many reasons she was considered for the endorsement offers she has received. She became the muse for Japanese skincare brand Hada Labo and cosmetics brands Kiss Me and Shiseido Korea, where she was also appointed as brand ambassador. Jeon also became a model for skincare brand COSRX. She has since become a brand spokesperson for ABC Mart's shoe brand Nuovo and was selected as an endorsement model for Beanpole Sports and fashion brand United Colors of Benetton Korea. In February 2022, she became the brand ambassador for Converse. Outside of the beauty and fashion industries, Jeon was selected as a model for Nongshim's snack Petit Paris Rollbread and hangover product HK inno.N. Jeon has also been invited to participate in campaigns for Fanta, Reebok (Classic SS18 campaign, "Always Classic"), and Louis Vuitton (2021 Eyewear Global Campaign).

Philanthropy 
In July 2016, Jeon alongside I.O.I band-mates Nayoung and Kyulkyung, collaborated with "Shoot For Love", a campaign organized by "Bekind" in cooperation with the Korea Leukemia and Pediatric Cancer Association, to raise awareness and funds for children diagnosed with pediatric cancer. The trio successfully completed the missions provided and raised ₩1 million.

Ambassadorship

Discography

Studio albums

Singles

Other charted songs

Songwriting credits 
All song credits are adapted from the Korea Music Copyright Association's database unless stated otherwise.

Videography

Filmography

Film

Television shows

Web shows

Hosting

Music video appearances

Awards and nominations

Notes

References

External links

 

2001 births
Living people
I.O.I members
21st-century South Korean women singers
Swing Entertainment artists
Canadian musicians of Korean descent
Canadian people of South Korean descent
Canadian female taekwondo practitioners
Hanlim Multi Art School alumni
JYP Entertainment artists
YG Entertainment artists
Musicians from Ontario
Produce 101 contestants
South Korean child singers
South Korean dance musicians
South Korean female idols
South Korean women pop singers
South Korean people of Canadian descent
South Korean female taekwondo practitioners